Sacothrips is a genus of thrips in the family Phlaeothripidae.

Species
 Sacothrips bicolor
 Sacothrips catheter
 Sacothrips corycidis
 Sacothrips galbus
 Sacothrips ingens
 Sacothrips mantoideus
 Sacothrips milvus

References

Phlaeothripidae
Thrips
Thrips genera